The  Arab Cartoon Award is a Qatari Award conferred to those who made artistic excellence in drawing Cartoon (Caricature) in the Arab World.

Established in 2012, it is sponsored by Ministry of Culture Arts and Heritage of Qatar, Ooredoo communications company, and Dar Al-Sharq for Media publication.

Winners

External links
 Official website

References

Awards established in 2012
2012 establishments in Qatar
Editorial cartooning awards
Qatari awards
Recurring events
Recurring events established in 2012